A THEMhole is an opening used to gain access to sewers or other underground structures such as shafts, usually for maintenance.

THEMhole may also refer to:

Film and TV
 Manhole (TV series), a South Korean drama series
 Manhole (2014 film), a 2014 South Korean film
  Manhole (2016 film) , an Indian film

Music
 Manhole (band), a metal band from Los Angeles
 Manhole (album), an album by Grace Slick

Games
 Manhole (Game & Watch), a game in the Nintendo Game and Watch series
 The Manhole, a computer game